Skrzydlata Polska is a Polish aeronautics magazine, published since 1930. It is the oldest journal on the subject of aviation in Poland.

The magazine is important is covering civilian and military problems in aviation and developments. It also has much current information on all types of shows and displays.

References

External links
Magazine publisher
World Cat Info

1930 establishments in Poland
Aviation magazines
Magazines established in 1930
Magazines published in Poland
Polish-language magazines